Epiphractis phoenicis is a moth of the family Oecophoridae. This species was described from a specimen from Bihé in central Angola.

The wingspan of the females is about 23 mm. Head and thorax are light rosy-ochreous, forewings elongate and dilated posteriorly, ochreous-crimson. Deeper purplish-crimson towards dorsum, lighter and more ochreous towards costa. The costal edge is whitish. The hindwings are grey.

References

Endemic fauna of Angola
Epiphractis
Moths described in 1908